Doubtnut is an Indian educational app started by Tanushree Nagori and Aditya Shankar. Doubtnut is available as an Android application on Play Store or by accessing its official website. in 2016.

Operation
The platform uses image recognition technologies to provide solutions of some mathematical and science questions. To find the solution to a question, one has to upload an image depicting the question. The app extracts text from the image and tries to match it in its database of questions which are pre-answered, having recorded video solutions. If it finds a match, then the result is provided to the user otherwise it asks the user to post their question publicly for tutors available on the platform to provide a video explaining their query.

Funding
Doubtnut received its first funding of US$100K from Ankit Nagori of Cure.fit in April, 2017.

In 2019, Omidyar Network and WaterBridge invested about $470,000. In January 2020, the company raised $15 million in Series A round of funding from Tencent Holdings, and existing investors Sequoia Capital and Omidyar Network India.

See also
 Byju's
 Vedantu

References 

Science websites
Organisations based in Gurgaon
Indian educational websites
Educational math software
Online tutoring
Education companies of India
Distance education institutions based in India
E-learning in India
Educational technology companies of India
2008 establishments in Haryana
Indian companies established in 2008